Thiago Bordin (born 1983 in São Paulo) is a Brazilian/German ballet dancer teacher and choreographer.

References

1983 births
Living people
Brazilian male ballet dancers
Prix Benois de la Danse winners
21st-century Brazilian dancers